Actaea spicata, the baneberry or herb Christopher, is a species of flowering plant in the genus Actaea, native from Europe to western Siberia and northern Iran. It is often found on limestone edges and in deciduous woodland; key factors are shade, low competition, and a cool, protected root run.

Description
The basal leaves are large, biternate or bipinnate. The leaflets are more-or-less toothed. The flowers are white, with 3–6 petaloid sepals, and are produced in an erect raceme.

Taxonomy

Actaea spicata was first described by Carl Linnaeus in 1753. Two varieties have been recognized:
Actaea spicata var. spicata. Europe, northwestern Asia.
Actaea spicata var. acuminata (syn. A. acuminata). Pakistan, India and the Himalayas, above 2000 m altitude.

Cultivation
Actaea spicata is cultivated as an ornamental plant. It is toxic by ingestion, and is also an irritant, so requires careful handling. It has been used as a homeopathic remedy for arthritis and joint pain.

References

Flora Europaea: Actaea spicata
Nepal Checklist: Actaea spicata var. acuminata

Plants for a Future: Actaea spicata
Edible and Medicinal plants of the West, Gregory L. Tilford, 

spicata
Flora of Eastern Europe
Flora of tropical Asia
Flora of temperate Asia
Plants described in 1753
Taxa named by Carl Linnaeus
Taxobox binomials not recognized by IUCN